Allison Crimmins is an American climate scientist and the director of the National Climate Assessment in the United States since 2021. She was appointed by President Joe Biden, and replaced Trump appointee Betsy Weatherhead.

She has a master of science in oceanography from San Francisco State University and a master in public policy from the Harvard Kennedy School, and worked with the U.S. Global Change Research Program in 2016. She currently works for the Environmental Protection Agency. In 2020, she called for the United States to have a "Department of Climate" to deal with climate change.

References

Biden administration personnel
Women climatologists
American climatologists
Year of birth missing (living people)
Living people
San Francisco State University alumni
Harvard Kennedy School alumni